Kılavuzlar is a village in the central district (Karabük) of Karabük Province, Turkey. The Araç creek is to the south of the village. The population of Cumayanı is 1682 as of 2011. The village economy depends on vegetable and fruit gardening.

References

Populated places in Karabük Province
Towns in Turkey
Karabük Central District